is a Japanese film directed by Nagisa Ōshima. It was based on the hit song "Kaette kita yopparai" by The Folk Crusaders, a folk and pop music group that also appeared in the film. It was released in March 1968.

Plot 
Three young men go to the beach. Someone steals their clothes while they swim, and replaces them with ones that then leave the three mistaken for illegal aliens. In a commentary on the way Korean immigrants are treated in Japan, the three must then flee from the authorities, who are presented in a ridiculing light.

Cast 
Cast:
 Kazuhiko Katō
 Osamu Kitayama
 Norihiko Hashida
 Kei Satō
 Cha Dae-Sun
 Fumio Watanabe
 Mako Midori
 Masao Adachi - Policeman

Home media 
A digitally restored version of the film was released on DVD by The Criterion Collection as part of their Eclipse Series.

References

External links 
 

1968 films
Films directed by Nagisa Ōshima
Japanese comedy films
Japanese black comedy films
1960s Japanese films